Daya may refer to:

Religion
Daya (Sikhism), the concept of compassion in Sikhism
Daya (virtue), the concept of compassion in Hinduism

Media and music
 Daya (film), a 1998 Malayalam film
 Daya (EP), a 2015 recording by the American singer Daya
 Daya — Chentheeyil Chalicha Kumkumapottu, a Malayalam TV serial starring Pallavi Gowda
 Daya Sagar, a 1978 Telugu film directed by A. Bhimsingh

Places
 Daya, Zanzibar, a village on the island of Pemba
 Daya, a historic Sumatran kingdom conquered by Ali Mughayat Syah in the 16th century
 Daya Bay, on the south coast of Guangdong Province, China
 Daya, Taichung, a suburban district in Taichung, Taiwan
 Daya Nueva, a municipality in Alicante Province, Valencian Community, Spain
 Daya River, in Orissa, India
 Daya Vieja, a municipality in Alicante Province, Valencian Community, Spain

People
 Daya Pawar (1935–1996), author and poet
 Daya Krishna (1924–2007), philosopher
 Daya (singer) (born 1998), American singer-songwriter
 Daya Betty, American drag queen
 Daya, courtesy name for Shi Hong (313–334), Chinese Emperor of Later Zhao

Given name
 Daya Bai, Indian social activist
 Daya Singh Bedi (1899–1975), Indian diplomat and officer in the British Indian Army
 Daya Ram Dahal, Nepalese film director
 Daya Gamage, Sri Lankan politician and businessman
 Daya Kishore Hazra, Indian doctor
 Daya Bir Singh Kansakar (1911–2001), Nepalese social worker
 Daya Krishna (1924–2007), Indian philosopher
 Daya Master (born 1956), Sri Lankan Tamil media spokesman
 Daya Mata (1914–2010), American spiritual teacher and leader
 Daya Rajasinghe Nadarajasingham (born 1948), Sri Lankan sports shooter
 Daya Shankar Kaul Nasim (1811–1845), Indian Urdu-language poet
 Daya Nayak, Indian police officer
 Daya Shankar Pandey (born 1965), Indian film and television actor
 Daya Pathirana (died 1986), assassinated Sri Lankan student leader
 Daya Pawar (1935–1996), Indian author and poet
 Daya Perera (died 2013), Sri Lankan diplomat and lawyer
 Daya Ratnasooriya, Sri Lankan zoologist 
 Daya Ratnayake, Sri Lankan Army commander
 B. S. Daya Sagar (born 1967), Indian mathematical geoscientist
 Daya Ram Sahni (1879–1939), Indian archaeologist
 Daya Sandagiri, Sri Lankan Navy commander
 Daya Shankar (cricketer), Indian cricketer who played 1943–44
 Daya Shankar (IRS officer), officer of the Indian Revenue Service
 Daya Shetty (born 1969), Indian model and actor
 Daya Singh (1661–1708), one of the first five Sikhs in the Khalsa order
 Daya Singh Sodhi (born 1925), Indian politician
 Daya Vaidya (born 1980), Nepalese-American actress 
 Daya Vati (1534–1581), Punjabi Sikh Guru
 Daya-Nand Verma (1933–2012), Indian mathematician
 Daya Wiffen (born 1983), New Zealand netball player

Surname
 Ahmad ibn Yusuf ibn al-Daya (835–912), Arab mathematician 
 Ali Daya, Tajik commander
 Houda Ben Daya (born 1979), Tunisian judoka
 Hugo Daya (born 1963), Colombian cyclist
 Kawkab Sabah al-Daya (born 1962), Syrian environmental minister
 Navasha Daya, vocalist and original member of American band Fertile Ground
 Pradnya Daya Pawar (born 1966), Indian Marathi-language poet and writer
 Sheraz Daya, British ophthalmologist
 Wen Daya, 7th-century Chinese writer who recorded the Battle of Huoyi in detail

Fictional
 Datu Daya, a legendary tribal chief in the Philippines
 Daya (Senior Inspector), a character in the Indian TV series CID
 Daya Diaz, a character on the American TV series Orange Is the New Black

Other
 Daya, a 2016 tropical storm in the Indian Ocean
 Daya Aviation, a domestic Sri Lankan airline
 Daya, nickname for the Israeli Air Force 192 Squadron

See also
 Dayah, a settlement in Ras al-Khaimah, United Arab Emirates
 Taya (disambiguation)